Helge Bjønsaas (born 21 May 1968) is a retired Norwegian football defender.

He joined IK Start from SK Haugar ahead of the 1992 season, and remained there throughout 2003 except for two and a half seasons at Viking FK. In 2004 he signed for up-and-coming team FK Arendal.

References

1968 births
Living people
People from Haugesund
Norwegian footballers
SK Haugar players
IK Start players
Viking FK players
FK Arendal players
Norwegian First Division players
Eliteserien players
Association football defenders
Sportspeople from Rogaland